Scopula sanguinisecta is a moth of the  family Geometridae. It is found in Angola, Kenya, Madagascar and South Africa.

Subspecies
Scopula sanguinisecta sanguinisecta (Kenya, South Africa)
Scopula sanguinisecta subcatenata Prout, 1932 (Madagascar)

References

Moths described in 1897
sanguinisecta
Moths of Africa
Moths of Madagascar